Romandi is a village in Siluwa village development committee of Palpa, Nepal.

Populated places in Palpa District